Kagalvadi is a village in Chamarajanagar district of Karnataka state, India.

Location
Kagalvadi is located between Chamarajanagar town and Yelandur town.

Postal code
There is a post office in Kagalvadi and the postal code is 571117.

Economy
The economy of the village is mostly agrarian. Indian Overseas Bank has a branch at Kagalvadi.

See also
 Rechamballi
 Yelandur
 Chamarajanagar
 Irasavadi

References

Villages in Chamarajanagar district